Handsome Brook is a river in Delaware County, New York. It flows into the Ouleout Creek southwest of Franklin.

References

Rivers of New York (state)
Rivers of Delaware County, New York
Tributaries of the Susquehanna River